In enzymology, an arogenate dehydrogenase [NAD(P)+] is an enzyme that catalyzes the chemical reaction

L-arogenate + NAD(P)+  L-tyrosine + NAD(P)H + CO2

The 3 substrates of this enzyme are L-arogenate, NAD+, and NADP+, whereas its 4 products are L-tyrosine, NADH, NADPH, and CO2.

This enzyme belongs to the family of oxidoreductases, specifically those acting on the CH-CH group of donor with NAD+ or NADP+ as acceptor.  The systematic name of this enzyme class is L-arogenate:NAD(P)+ oxidoreductase (decarboxylating). Other names in common use include arogenic dehydrogenase (ambiguous), cyclohexadienyl dehydrogenase, and pretyrosine dehydrogenase (ambiguous).

References

 
 

EC 1.3.1
NADPH-dependent enzymes
NADH-dependent enzymes
Enzymes of unknown structure